Walk That Walk, Talk That Talk is a 1991 studio album by Texas based blues rock band The Fabulous Thunderbirds and the first without guitarist Jimmie Vaughan. He was replaced by Duke Robillard and Kid Bangham for the recording. The album marks a return to the straightforward blues-rock sound of their early material, abandoning the overly commercial production of their previous three albums.

Track listing
All tracks composed by Kim Wilson; except where indicated
 "Twist of the Knife" (Chuck Jones, Rick Giles, Kim Wilson)
 "Ain't That a Lot of Love" (Deanie Parker, Homer Banks)
 "Work Together"
 "Born to Love You" (Duke Robillard)
 "Need Somebody to Love" (Jerry Lynn Williams, Kim Wilson)
 "Feelin' Good" (Herman "Junior" Parker)
 "Roller Coaster"
 "Sweet Thang"
 "Can't Stop Rockin'"
 "When I Get Home" (Kim Wilson, Rick Giles)
 "Paralyzed"

Personnel
Kim Wilson - vocals, harmonica
Duke Robillard - guitar, vocals
Kid Bangham - guitar
Steve Jordan - guitar, percussion, backing vocals
Preston Hubbard - electric and upright bass
Austin de Lone - keyboards
Fran Christina - drums, percussion

References

External links
Official Site

1991 albums
The Fabulous Thunderbirds albums